 

This article is a list of known military operations of the Vietnam War in 1972, conducted by the armed forces of the Republic of Vietnam, the Khmer Republic, the United States and their allies.

See also
 List of allied military operations of the Vietnam War (1973–1974)

References

External links
 HELICOPTER Operations in VIETNAM
 Special Operations in Vietnam
 Information About Records Relating to the Vietnam War Operations Analysis (OPSANAL) System
 Naval Operations in Vietnam

1972
Military operations involving the United States
Military operations involving Vietnam
Operations 1972
 
1972 in Cambodia
1972 in Vietnam